The Autovía A-58 (also known as Autovía Trujillo - Cáceres) is an autovía in the community of Extremadura, Spain. It starts at the Autovía A-5 just north of Trujillo and ends on the eastern outskirts of Cáceres, close to the Autovía A-66, while running parallel to the N-521 road. It was built between 2007 and 2009.

References 

A-58
A-58